Clara Blinn (1847 – 1868) was an American settler who, with her two-year-old son Willie, was captured by Indians in October 1868 in Colorado Territory during an attack on the wagon train in which she and her family were traveling. She and her little boy were killed on or about November 27, 1868 during or in the immediate aftermath of the Battle of Washita River, in which the camp of the Cheyenne chief Black Kettle was attacked and destroyed by troops of the Seventh U.S. Cavalry under the command of Lt. Col. George Armstrong Custer.  Clara and Willie Blinn's bodies were found some two weeks after the fight in one of several abandoned Indian camps along the Washita River near present-day Cheyenne, Oklahoma.

Clara and Willie Blinn remain at the center of a historical controversy over the exact circumstances of their death, the identity of their captors, and the location of their bodies when they were found. Contemporary sources disagree over whether the Blinns were held captive by Kiowas, Cheyennes, or Arapahos and, if by Cheyennes, whether they were held in Black Kettle's camp or in one of the other Cheyenne villages encamped along the Washita River at the time of the attack. Present-day authorities on the Battle of the Washita continue to reflect differing opinions on these questions.

Early life and marriage
Clara Isabel Harrington was born in Elmore, Ohio on October 21, 1847.  Daughter of William T. and Harriet Bosley Harrington, who later became proprietors of the Baird House Hotel in Perrysburg, Ohio. She was described by her family as a "tiny, beautiful girl with dark hair, freckles sprinkled across her nose, a dimple in her chin, and an inveterate joker who exuded exuberance and a joy for living."

On August 12, 1865 she married Richard Foote Blinn of Perrysburg. Richard had fought in the American Civil War in the 31st Ohio Cavalry, receiving an early discharge after suffering a wound to his arm from which he never fully recovered. Despite the wound, he later enlisted and served in a "hundred days" volunteer unit. The Blinns were members of the Perrysburg Methodist Episcopal Church. Clara gave birth to a son, William, known as "Willie," in 1866.

Colorado Territory
In spring of 1868, the Harringtons departed Perrysburg to go west, settling in Ottawa, Franklin County, Kansas. Richard and Clara Blinn, with Willie traveled further west, all the way to Colorado Territory. After a few months in Colorado they wrote to Clara's maternal aunt Myra Mottram of their intent to surprise Clara's parents by relocating to Kansas to be nearer to them. However, Clara's aunt evidently told the Harringtons, who waited, futilely, for the arrival of their daughter and her family.

Richard joined in a partnership with his brother-in-law, John F. Buttles, to deliver supplies to government outposts. The pair organized a wagon train of eight wagons, one hundred cattle, ten men (including Richard), and Clara and Willie, departing Bogg's Ranch in Colorado Territory on October 5 or 6, 1868, bound eastward towards Fort Dodge, Kansas along the Arkansas River on the Santa Fe Trail. They had plans to stop off in Ottawa with the Harringtons. Clara and Willie rode in the supply wagon, with Clara carrying on her person money belonging to John Buttles and her husband's brother Hubble Blinn, including a bag of gold coins and a bundle of nearly $800 in bills.

Capture
One man was wounded during the attack, and the Indians succeeded in stampeding the ox teams, acquiring four of the wagons and taking Mrs. Blinn and her child captive. The remaining wagons were set afire with flaming arrows. Throughout the day and into the night the Indians kept up their attack on the remainder of the train, during which time the Indian party increased to about 200 warriors. On the following day, October 8, most of the Indians withdrew across the Arkansas to camp on its south bank, but returned that night to renew the attack. They attacked again on October 9, besieging the men for four more days before withdrawing again across the Arkansas River to ride off to the southeast.

On October 12, one of the men got away and went to Fort Lyon to seek help. Captain William Penrose sent out ten men under Lt. Henry H. Abell to relieve the men still with the wagon train and to search for Mrs. Blinn and her son. About  from where the wagon train had been held under attack, the soldiers found a note Clara had written on a card and laid on a bush along the trail. The note read, "Dear Dick, Willie and I are prisoners.  They are going to keep us.  If you live, save us if you can. We are with them. [signed] Clara Blinn."

Mr. Owen, the leader of the train, identified Satanta, a prominent Kiowa warrior, as having been among the raiders. According to other sources, the Indians were believed to be mostly Cheyenne or Arapaho.

Notes

References
 Blinn, Clara. (1868). Letter [to William Griffenstein]. November 7. In U.S. Senate 1869, pp. 41–42.  Reproduced in Hardorff 2006, pp. 42–43.
  Blinn, Richard. (1868). Richard Blinn Diary: Transcript. MMS 1646 mf. Bowling Green, OH: Bowling Green State University, Center for Archival Collections.
 Brewster, Charles [1st lieutenant, Seventh Cavalry]. (1899). "Battle of the Washita." National Tribune. May 18. Extracted in Hardorff 2006, pp. 158–161.
 Clark, Ben [chief of scouts attached to Seventh Cavalry]. (1899). "Custer's Washita Fight" [interview]. New York Sun. May 14. Reproduced in Hardorff 2006, pp. 204–215.
 Clark, Ben. (1903). Letter to Frederick Barde.  May 1. Reproduced in Hardorff 2006, pp. 235–236.
 Clark, Ben. (1910). Interview by Walter C. Camp. Box 3 (Battle of the Washita), Walter Camp Manuscripts, Lilly Library, Indiana University, Bloomington. Reproduced in Hardorff 2006, pp. 224–228.
 Cozzens, Peter, ed. (2003). Eyewitnesses to the Indian Wars, Volume Three: Conquering the Southern Plains. Mechanicsburg, PA: Stackpole Books. .
 Custer, George Armstrong [lieutenant colonel, 7th U.S. Cavalry]. (1868-12-22). Report to Brevet Lt. Col. J. Schuyler Crosby, Acting Assistant Adjutant General, Department of the Missouri. In U.S. House of Representatives 1870, pp. 155–162. Reproduced in Hardorff 2006, pp. 66–79.
 Custer, George Armstrong. (1874). My Life on the Plains: Or Personal Experiences With the Indians. New York: Sheldon and Company. Also available online from Kansas Collection Books.
 Greene, Jerome A. (2004). Washita, The Southern Cheyenne and the U.S. Army. Campaigns and Commanders Series, vol. 3. Norman, OK: University of Oklahoma Press. .
 Hoig, Stan. (1980). The Battle of the Washita: The Sheridan-Custer Indian Campaign of 1867-69. Lincoln, NE: University of Nebraska Press. . Previously published in 1976 (Garden City, NY: Doubleday). .
 Hardorff, Richard G., compiler & editor (2006). Washita Memories: Eyewitness Views of Custer's Attack on Black Kettle's Village. Norman, OK: University of Oklahoma Press. .
 Hazen, W.B. [colonel, military Indian agent for Southern Indian Military District] (1868-11-20). "Record of a conversation held between Colonel and Brevet Major General W. B. Hazen, U.S. Army, on special service, and chiefs of the Cheyenne and Arapaho tribes of Indians, at Fort Cobb, Indian Territory, November 20, 1868." In U.S. Senate 1869, pp. 22–23. Excerpted in Hoig 1980, pp. 89–92; Greene 2004, p. 107; Hatch 2004, p. 240; Hardorff 2006, pp. 55–57.
 Hazen, W.B. (1868-11-22). Letter to Lt. Gen. William T. Sherman, U.S. Army. In U.S. Senate 1869, pp. 24–25.
 Hazen, W.B. (1869-01-18).  Letter to James A. Garfield, chairman of the House Military Affairs Committee, U.S. House of Representatives. Published in the New York Times, February 21, 1869. Excerpted in Hardorff 2006, pp. 289–290.
 Hazen, W.B. (1868-12-31). Letter to Lt. Gen. William T. Sherman, U.S. Army. In U.S. Senate 1869, p. 51.
 Hazen, W.B. (1925-12). "Some Corrections of 'Life on the Plains.'" Reprinted with editorial introduction in Chronicles of Oklahoma 3(4): 295-318 (December 1925). Originally published as a pamphlet (St. Paul, MN: Ramaley & Cunningham, 1874).
 Justus, Judith P. (2000). "The Saga of Clara H. Blinn at the Battle of the Washita." Research Review: Journal of the Little Bighorn Associates 14(1): 11–20.
 Keim, Deb. Randolph. (1869-01-04). "The Indian War." New York Herald. Dispatch dated December 11, 1868. Extracted in Hardorff 2006, pp. 255–263.
 Moore, Horace L. (1924). "The Nineteenth Kansas Cavalry in the Washita Campaign." Chronicles of Oklahoma 2(4): 350-365 (December 1924). Originally presented on January 1, 1897 as an address before the 21st annual meeting of the Kansas State Historical Society and published in Transactions of the Kansas State Historical Society 6: 35-52 (1900). Reproduced in Cozzens 2003, pp. 263–279.
 Michno, Gregory F. (2005–12). "Cheyenne Chief Black Kettle." Wild West (magazine). Retrieved through Historynet.com on 2007-06-28.
 Michno, Gregory F. (2007-06). "Captive Clara Blinn's Plea: 'If You Love Us, Save Us.'" Wild West (magazine) 20(1): 50-57.
 Rodgers, Joseph Phelps [private, Nineteenth Kansas Cavalry]. (n.d.). "A Few Years of Experiences on the Western Frontier." Miscellaneous Collections, Manuscript Division, Kansas State Historical Society, Topeka. Reproduced in Cozzens 2003, pp. 307–323.
 Sheridan, Philip H. [major general, Department of the Missouri]. (1868-12-19). Report to Brevet Maj. Gen. W.A. Nichols, Assistant Adjutant General, Military Division of the Missouri. In U.S. Senate 1869, pp. 39–41. Reproduced in Hardorff 2006, pp. 278–280.
 Stewart, Milton [captain, Nineteenth Kansas Cavalry]. (1869). "From the 19th Regiment" [letters]. Kansas City Weekly Union, February 6. Letter dated December 20, 1868 extracted in Hardorff 2006, pp. 264–266.
 United States and Philip Henry Sheridan. (1882). Record of Engagements with the Hostile Indians within the Military Division of the Missouri, from 1868 to 1882, Lieutenant-General P.H. Sheridan, Commanding. Chicago: Headquarters Military Division of the Missouri.
 U.S. House of Representatives. (1870). Difficulties with Indian Tribes. 41st Congress, 2nd session, House Executive Document 240.
 U.S. Senate. (1869). Documents Related to the Indian Battle on the Washita River in November 1868. 40th Congress, 3rd Session, 1869, Senate Executive Document 18.

External links
 Clara Harrington Blinn at rootsweb.ancestry.com

1847 births
1868 deaths
Comanche campaign
People from Elmore, Ohio
People from Perrysburg, Ohio